Danny Wynn (born September 25, 1983, in St. Louis, Missouri) is an American soccer defender who spent one season with the New England Revolution in Major League Soccer.  He currently plays for the St. Louis Illusion in the Professional Arena Soccer League.

Wynn grew up in St. Louis, Missouri.  He was an All State soccer player at Chaminade College Preparatory School (Missouri).  He then attended Saint Louis University where he was part of the men's soccer team from 2002 to 2005.  In March 2006, the Milwaukee Wave of the Major Indoor Soccer League selected Wynn in the MISL Draft.  However, the same month, the New England Revolution selected him in the first round (11th overall) in the 2006 MLS Supplemental Draft and signed him to a developmental contract.  He played two games and was waived at the end of the season.  In July 2007, the New Jersey Ironmen of Major Indoor Soccer League selected Wynn in the 16th round (136th overall) in the MISL Supplemental Draft, but he did not sign with them.  In November 2008, Wynn signed with the newly established St. Louis Illusion of the Professional Arena Soccer League. And currently works at WWT.  Part time lover.

References

External links
 St. Louis University player bio
 New England Revolution player bio

1983 births
Living people
American soccer players
New England Revolution players
Professional Arena Soccer League players
Saint Louis Billikens men's soccer players
Soccer players from St. Louis
Major League Soccer players
New England Revolution draft picks
Association football midfielders
St. Louis Illusion players